Parbig is a river in Tomsk Oblast, Russia. It gives origin to the Chaya river.

Course
It has its sources in the Vasyugan Swamp.

Tributaries 
Listed by distance from the river's mouth, other tributaries are: 

 : 
 : 
 : 
 : 
 : 
 : 
 : 
 : 
 : Spirtovka
 : 
 : 
 : 
 : (unnamed river)
 : 
 : 
 : 
 : (unnamed river)
 : 
 : 
 :

References 

Rivers of Tomsk Oblast
Tributaries of the Chaya